Keshavan is both a surname and a given name. Notable people with the name include:

 Shiva Keshavan (born 1981), Indian luger
 Sujata Keshavan (born 1961), Indian graphic designer
 Keshavan Maslak (born 1947), American jazz musician

See also
 Guruvayur Keshavan (1904–1976), a famous temple-elephant of Kerala, South India
 Kesavan